is a former professional boxer who competed as a light middleweight throughout his career.

Mihara began his boxing career when he was a third grader of the high school. He won the title of the All-Japan Amateur Boxing Championships in the light middleweight division in 1977. He also got the group title of the university league as a captain of the Nihon University boxing club. He experienced 38 matches during his amateur career; winning 28 (15 by knockout) and losing 10.

After that, as a professional, Mihara fought 25 times between 1978 and 1985; winning 24 (15 by knockout) and losing 1. He won his first title in his fifth contest as a professional, beating Jae-Keum Lim for the OPBF title, a belt that he defended six times until he returned it. In June 1981, he won via a fifth-round knockout, in the undercard of Ayub Kalule vs. Sugar Ray Leonard, at the Reliant Astrodome, Houston. Since Leonard vacated the title after this, Mihara fought against Rocky Fratto for the vacant WBA world junior middleweight title in Rochester, New York on November 7, 1981. Mihara knocked him down by his right cross in the fourth round, and won the title via a majority decision. Judge Harold Lederman scored the fight a draw. Afterwards he said of Mihara, "There's no doubt that  he's got a good jaw. He really got tagged a couple of times. I thought Fratto was going to knock him out." He lost his title after suffering a knockout during his first defence, against Davey Moore at the Tokyo Metropolitan Gymnasium on February 2, 1982. His lumbago became chronic from these days. Following this loss, Mihara won the Japanese junior middleweight title and defended it six times until June 1984, then returned it. He fought for a final time in March 1985, beating Tricky Kawaguchi by a unanimous decision.

Professional boxing record

See also 
List of WBA world champions
List of super welterweight boxing champions
List of Japanese boxing world champions
Boxing in Japan

References

External links

|-

1955 births
People from Gunma Prefecture
Light-middleweight boxers
World light-middleweight boxing champions
World Boxing Association champions
Living people
Nihon University alumni
Japanese male boxers